Yrick Rapisura Gallantes (born 14 January 2001) is a Filipino professional footballer who plays as a winger for Philippines Football League (PFL) club Azkals Development Team (ADT), and the Philippines national team.

Club career

Hibernian
Gallantes was born in the Philippines, but was raised in Scotland after his family emigrated there. He started his football career in the Hibernian academy. He first played for the club's development squad in October 2016, aged 15.

Loan to Gala Fairydean Rovers
In July 2019, Galantes was sent out on loan to Lowland Football League club Gala Fairydean Rovers. On 21 September, he scored in the first round of the Scottish Cup as Gala won 3–1 away over Dalbeattie Star.

Azkals Development Team
In October 2020, Gallantes was loaned to the Azkals Development Team (ADT) of the Philippines Football League (PFL). He started in ADT's first PFL match of the season on 28 October, a 1–0 loss to United City. He scored his first PFL goal on 6 November, in a 5–0 victory over Maharlika Manila.

In September 2021, Gallantes returned to ADT on a permanent deal.

International career
He is currently available to represent both the Philippines and Scotland.

Philippines U-23
Gallantes was part of the Philippines U-23 squad that competed in the 2019 Southeast Asian Games held in Philippines.

Gallantes was included in the 20-man squad for 31st Southeast Asian Games, which was held in Vietnam.

Philippines
In March 2019, Galantes received an invitation to train with the Philippines national team. He was called up for the Philippines squad in August 2019, ahead of the 2022 FIFA World Cup qualifiers against Syria and Guam. He made his debut for the Philippines in a 4–1 win against Guam on 10 September. He was part of the starting eleven of that match but was substituted out on the 36th minute for Javier Patiño.

References

External links

2001 births
Living people
Filipino footballers
Philippines international footballers
Scottish footballers
Association football midfielders
Hibernian F.C. players
Gala Fairydean Rovers F.C. players
Filipino emigrants to Scotland
Competitors at the 2019 Southeast Asian Games
Azkals Development Team players
Competitors at the 2021 Southeast Asian Games
Southeast Asian Games competitors for the Philippines